Johore Football Association (JFA) is the governing body of football for the state of Johor, Malaysia. JFA is responsible for coordinating and developing football in the state of Johor and has teamed up with the Football Association of Malaysia (FAM) as the official governing body of football in Malaysia.

Structure
Johor Football Association has developed a new structure of managing a football association that goes beyond having a strong team competing for honours, but also being more involved in educating youths in Johor on living a healthy lifestyle. It is designed with the vision of Tunku Ismail Sultan Ibrahim, The Crown Prince of Johor, along with the input from legendary footballer Johan Cruyff.

The blueprint of the Johor football project is made of three main objectives. The first objective is to have a quality football team. Secondly is to be financially strong, and to be recognized as a football force throughout Asia and the world. The third objective is to unite the Johorean people, regardless of race or religion, and encouraging youths to live a healthy lifestyle.

The players who are performing well and show potential in the second team will be promoted to play for Johor Darul Ta'zim F.C., at the discretion of the manager/head coach. This structure that Johor FA is adopting has already been successfully implemented by top football teams such as Real Madrid, Barcelona, Borussia Dortmund, FC Bayern Munich and AC Milan. By implementing this system, we are opening doors for Johorean youths to a career in football, and the chance for them to represent their state. It is also advantageous financial-wise, since it would be unnecessary for the association to pay large transfer fees during the transfer windows. In turn, it will place the association in a more solid financial position and also having more Johoreans representing the state team.

History

Johor Football Association also simply known as Johor FA, is the governing body of football in Johor Bahru, Malaysia. Johor FA is responsible for coordinating and developing football in the state of Johor and has teamed up with the Football Association of Malaysia (FAM) as the official governing body of football in Malaysia.

Formed on 29 December 1955, it was initially based in Kluang, Johor. In its early years of establishment, Johor FA was registered under the Societies Act 1966 and subsequently re-registered under the Commissioner of Sports Development Act 1997. Central to the creation of Stadium Tan Sri Haji Hassan Yunos, the association has also been entrusted to organize the first round and quarter-final World Youth Cup competition in 1997 and the Asian Zone World Cup qualifier between Iran and Japan in the same year. The stadium is based at Larkin.

Johor FA starts its football development by forming its first professional football team, Johor FA. Under this period, Johor FA has made several achievements including Malaysia Cup champion in 1985 and 1991, the Razak Cup champions in 1983 and won the first FA Cup in 1998. In 1972, the association build its first professional club team, PKENJ FC, now known as Johor Darul Ta’zim F.C. The club also made several achievements with two consecutive FAM Cup in 1994 and 1995 and winning its first Malaysia Premier League title in 2001. The club now plays in top division side, the Malaysia Super League.

Association Management

Football Clubs

PBNJ starts its football development by forming its first professional football team, Johor FA. Under this period, Johor FA  has made several achievements including Malaysia Cup champion in 1985 and 1991, the Razak Cup champions in 1983 and won the first FA Cup in 1998.

In 1972, the association build its first professional club team, PKENJ FC, now known as Johor Darul Takzim F.C. The club also made several achievements with two consecutive FAM Cup in 1994 and 1995 and winning its first Malaysia Premier League title in 2001. The club now plays in top division side, the Malaysia Super League.

Competitions

Competition(s) under PBNJ:
Johor Darul Ta’zim League (HM Sultan of Johor Cup)
U-20 Johor Darul Ta’zim League (HRH Crown Prince of Johor Cup)
U-18 Johor Darul Ta’zim League (Tunku Temenggong Johor Cup)
U-16 Johor Darul Ta’zim League 
U-14 Johor Darul Ta’zim League 
U-12 Johor Darul Ta’zim League (Tunku Laksamana Johor Cup)

References

External links
 FAM Affiliates
 PBNJ Organization

Sport in Johor
Football associations in Malaysia
Sports organizations established in 1955
1955 establishments in Malaya